The Church Midwing JC-1,  a.k.a. Church Mid-Wing Sport, is a midwing racing aircraft designed by James Church using the fuselage of a Heath aircraft.

Design and development
The Church Midwing was designed to be an affordable homebuilt aircraft. Church marketed kits for $190.

The open cockpit midwing aircraft featured windows in the wings for visibility downward.

Operational history
Built to be a pylon racer, a Church Midwing placed third in the 1930 National Air Races. The Church used many parts from the Heath Parasol design. In 1931 the prototype was modified with an installation of a 38 hp inline air-cooled Church designed engine and a cowling modification to accommodate the cylinders protruding upward in the pilot's line of sight. A 1931 advertisement placed by Heath in Popular Mechanics extolled the virtues of its first-place finish with its parasol configuration, compared to the Church's midwing planform.

Variants
RW4 RagWing Midwing Sport Replica
An ultralight replica of the JC-1, produced by RagWing Aircraft Designs.
Church Racer
Essentially a Midwing fitted with a model J-3 46hp Church Marathon engine.

Aircraft on Display
EAA AirVenture Museum, Oshkosh, Wisconsin - 1 A Basket case 5 year restoration completed in 1971 by Gene Chase, outfitted with a Heath-Henderson B-4 engine.

Specifications (Church Midwing JC-1)

See also

References

External links

Aerofiles

1920s United States sport aircraft
Homebuilt aircraft
Mid-wing aircraft
Single-engined tractor aircraft
Aircraft first flown in 1928